Taylor Kay Rene Comeau (born July 21, 1993) is an American retired soccer player who played as a midfielder. She played for Portland Thorns FC, Chicago Red Stars, and Houston Dash in the National Women's Soccer League (NWSL).

Early life
Taylor Comeau attended Los Gatos High School. Comeau played for California Golden Bears in Pac-12 Conference during her college years.

Playing career

Portland Thorns FC, 2015
Comeau appeared in 9 games for Portland in 2015 as an amateur call-up to cover for Thorns players missing for International duty.

Chicago Red Stars, 2016–2018
Comeau was named to the 2016 Chicago Red Stars final roster, after having been a trialist. On July 16, 2016, in her second start for Chicago Red Stars Taylor Comeau scored a crucial goal in a 1–0 away win over Orlando Pride; which positioned the Red Stars in solitary possession of fourth place in 2016 National Women's Soccer League season putting the team on track to a playoff spot. On June 18, 2018, Comeau was traded alongside Sofia Huerta to the Houston Dash as part of a three team trade that also included the Utah Royals FC

Houston Dash, 2018–2019
After being acquired midseason by the Dash, Comeau made her debut for Houston on June 22 against Portland Thorns FC.

Retirement

Comeau announced her retirement on June 18, 2019.

References

External links
 Chicago Red Stars player profile
 Cal Golden Bears player profile
 

1993 births
Living people
American women's soccer players
California Golden Bears women's soccer players
Chicago Red Stars players
National Women's Soccer League players
People from Los Gatos, California
Seattle Sounders Women players
Soccer players from California
Sportspeople from Santa Clara County, California
Women's association football midfielders
Houston Dash players
Portland Thorns FC players